Ruellia  tomentosa is a plant native to the Cerrado vegetation of Brazil.

tomentosa
Flora of Brazil